Potassium fluorosilicate is a chemical compound with the chemical formula .

When doped with Potassium hexafluoromanganate(IV) it forms a narrow band red producing phosphor, (often abbreviated PSF or KSF), of economic interest due to its applicability in LED lighting and displays.

Natural occurrence
Occurs naturally as Hiereatite, found in the Aeolian islands (Sicily/Italy). A hexagonal form Demartinite has also been found at the rim of volcanic fumaroles in the same islands.

Structure and properties
According to analysis by (Loehlin, 1984) it has space group Fmm, with a0 = 0.8134 nm, V = 0.538.2 nm3 at 295K. The Si-F bond length is 0.1683 nm. At high temperatures and pressures -beta and -gamma phases exist.

Application 
Potassium fluorosilicate has applications in porcelain manufacture, the preservation of timber, aluminium and magnesium smelting, and the manufacture of optical glass.

Red phosphor
When doped with potassium hexafluoromanganate(IV) ), a narrow band red phosphor is produced, emitting at around 630 nm. This substance has application improving the white light quality of white LEDs that use a blue emitting LED in combination with the yellow cerium doped yttrium aluminium garnet phosphor (YAG), .

Synthesis routes to the phosphor include co-crystallisation and co-precipitation. For example,  in (40%) hydrofluoric acid with potassium fluoride can be mixed with  dissolved in (40%) hydrofluoric acid to co-precipitate the phosphor.

The acronyms KSF or PSF are used for potassium fluorosilicate phosphors.

See also

 Fluorosilicic acid
 Ammonium fluorosilicate
 Sodium fluorosilicate

References 

Potassium compounds
Hexafluorosilicates
Phosphors and scintillators